The River Cam is a river in Cambridgeshire, England

River Cam or Cam River may also refer to
in England
 River Cam (Gloucestershire)
 River Cam (Somerset)
 Cam Beck in Cumbria

elsewhere
 Cam River (Tasmania), Australia
 Cam River (Marlborough), New Zealand
 Cam River / Ruataniwha, New Zealand
 Cấm River (Vietnam) (Sông Cấm)

See also
 Cam Brook, Somerset, England